The starry pipefish (Halicampus punctatus) is a species of marine fish of the family Syngnathidae. It is endemic to Japan, found near Honshu, Kyushu, and Okinawa, where it lives in open sandy areas near reefs. It is expected to feed on small crustaceans, similar to other pipefish. This species is ovoviviparous, with males carrying eggs before giving birth to live young.

References

Further reading
IUCN Seahorse, Pipefish & Stickleback Specialist Group

Fish described in 1952
Taxa named by Toshiji Kamohara
punctatus
Marine fish